Musius quadrinodosus is a species of beetle in the family Cerambycidae. It was described by Fairmaire in 1889.

References

Dorcasominae
Beetles described in 1889